Liam Moffatt (born 30 March 1997) is a Canadian snowboarder who competes internationally in the snowboard cross discipline.

Career
At the 2021 World Championships in Sweden, Moffatt finished 7th in the snowboard cross event.

As of December 2021, Moffatt was ranked 17th in the world. In January 2022, Moffatt was named to Canada's 2022 Olympic team in the snowboard cross event.

References

External links
 

1997 births
Living people
People from Truro, Nova Scotia
Canadian male snowboarders
Snowboarders at the 2022 Winter Olympics
Olympic snowboarders of Canada